Karol Kłos (born 8 August 1989) is a Polish professional volleyball player. He is a member of the Poland national team, a participant in the Olympic Games Rio 2016, and the 2014 World Champion. At the professional club level, he plays for PGE Skra Bełchatów.

Personal life
On 15 July 2017, he married Aleksandra Dudzicka. He is a graduate of the Miguel de Cervantes Liceum in Warsaw.

Career

Clubs
Kłos moved to Skra Bełchatów in 2010. He signed a new contract with Skra towards the end of the 2014/2015 season. On 27 May 2014 his team won the Polish Championship after final matches against Asseco Resovia. That was his second national title. On 8 October 2014 his team won the Polish SuperCup. On 6 May 2015 he won a bronze medal of the Polish Championship.

In May 2015 he extended his contract with Skra Bełchatów until the end of the 2016/2017 season. On 7 February 2016 alongside PGE Skra he won the Polish Cup after beating ZAKSA in the final. In April 2016 he was a member of the same team which won a bronze medal of the Polish Championship.

National team
On 21 September 2014 he won a title of the 2014 World Champion and received an individual award for the Best Middle Blocker of the tournament.
On 27 October 2014 Kłos received a state award granted by the Polish President Bronisław Komorowski – Gold Cross of Merit for outstanding sports achievements and worldwide promotion of Poland. In April 2015 he was announced as a new captain of the national team. Due to an injury he did not take part in the intercontinental round of the 2015 World League and was replaced by Michał Kubiak.

Honours

Clubs
 CEV Champions League
  2011/2012 – with PGE Skra Bełchatów
 FIVB Club World Championship
  Doha 2010 – with PGE Skra Bełchatów
 National championships
 2010/2011  Polish Cup, with PGE Skra Bełchatów
 2010/2011  Polish Championship, with PGE Skra Bełchatów
 2011/2012  Polish Cup, with PGE Skra Bełchatów
 2012/2013  Polish SuperCup, with PGE Skra Bełchatów
 2013/2014  Polish Championship, with PGE Skra Bełchatów
 2014/2015  Polish SuperCup, with PGE Skra Bełchatów
 2015/2016  Polish Cup, with PGE Skra Bełchatów
 2017/2018  Polish SuperCup, with PGE Skra Bełchatów
 2017/2018  Polish Championship, with PGE Skra Bełchatów
 2018/2019  Polish SuperCup, with PGE Skra Bełchatów

Youth national team
 2007  CEV U19 European Championship

Universiade
 2013  Summer Universiade

Individual awards
 2014: FIVB World Championship – Best Middle Blocker
 2022: Polish Championship – Best Blocker

State awards
 2014:  Gold Cross of Merit

References

External links

 
 Player profile at PlusLiga.pl 
 Player profile at Volleybox.net
 
 

1989 births
Living people
Volleyball players from Warsaw
Polish men's volleyball players
Polish Champions of men's volleyball
Olympic volleyball players of Poland
Volleyball players at the 2016 Summer Olympics
Universiade medalists in volleyball
Universiade silver medalists for Poland
Medalists at the 2013 Summer Universiade
Recipients of the Gold Cross of Merit (Poland)
Projekt Warsaw players
Skra Bełchatów players
Middle blockers